Fungal Diversity is an international journal which publishes papers spanning all facets of the field of mycology. It is a peer-reviewed scientific journal that covers the biodiversity, and systematic and molecular phylogeny of the fungi, including lichens. The coverage encompasses biodiversity, and systematic and molecular phylogeny. The content includes novel research articles and review articles, all of which are peer reviewed. Fungal Diversity is the official journal of  Kunming Institute of Botany of the Chinese Academy of Sciences, which is based in China.

Publication Bias
From the 133 research articles published between January 2015 and April 2020, 62.4% (83) had at least one member of the editorial board within the authors and 51.1% (68) carried the name of the same researcher (Kevin D. Hyde) as an author.

Within the top 10 publishing authors in the journal (more than 22 articles published in the period above) only two are not members of the editorial board.

The journal self-citation is considerably high. On average per article 17.33 citations refer to another Fungal Diversity article, this number can be as high as 156 in an article published in 2017.

These actions help to inflate the impact factor of the journal without being caught by the scrutinizing agencies.

References

External links
 

Mycology journals
Publications established in 2010
Irregular journals